European highway E 134 is a European highway that crosses Norway starting at Haugesund Airport, Karmøy near the city of Haugesund on the west coast, heading over Haukeli, passing the city of Drammen, and ending in Vassum on the east side of the Oslofjord Tunnel.

The stretch of road through the mountains is called Haukelifjell.

Route

Rogaland county 

Karmøy municipality
 Haugesund Airport
 Karmsund Bridge
Haugesund municipality
Karmøy municipality
Tysvær municipality
Aksdal village
  south to Stavanger
The highways  and  run together for about 
  north to Bergen
Vindafjord municipality
Skjold village
A new road and tunnel was built around Skjold, opening in 2015
Ølensjøen village

Vestland county 

Etne municipality
Etnesjøen village
 Åkrafjord Tunnel: 
 Markhus Tunnel: 
 Langfossen waterfall
 Fjæra Tunnel: 
 Rullestad Tunnel: 
Ullensvang municipality
 to Skare and Odda
 Seljestad Tunnel: 
 Røldal Tunnel: 
 Horda Tunnel: 
Håra village
Røldal village
 Austmannali Tunnel: 
 Haukeli Tunnel:  - replaced the Old Dyrskartunnel
 Haukelifjell

Vestfold og Telemark county 

Vinje municipality
Vinje village
 Vågslid Tunnel: 
Haukeli center
 to Setesdalen district
Åmot center
Tokke municipality
Høydalsmo village
Kviteseid municipality
Brunkeberg village
 to Kviteseid village
Seljord municipality
Seljord village
 to Bø municipality
Flatdal village
 Mælefjell Tunnel: ↓ 
Hjartdal municipality
Hjartdal village
 Mælefjell Tunnel: ↑ 
Sauland village
Notodden municipality
Heddal village
Notodden city

Viken county 

Kongsberg municipality
Kongsberg city
Øvre Eiker municipality
Hokksund town
Drammen municipality
Mjøndalen village
 Strømsås Tunnel: 
Drammen city

Lier municipality
Asker municipality
 Elgskauås Tunnel: 
 Oslofjord Tunnel: 

Frogn municipality
 (terminus of E134)

History 
A road over the mountain along this route was opened first time in 1889. In 1968, the Haukeli Tunnel was opened allowing reliable wintertime traffic.

The road was numbered as European route E76 before 1992, when the numbering system of all of the European routes in the Nordic countries was revised. Initially, there was not room for it in the system, and road became called Norwegian National Road 11 (Riksvei 11). Due to local wishes and steadily increasing of the road standard during the 1990s, it again received European route status, with the number E 134.

The route has many tunnels, especially in the mountainous sections in the central and western parts, especially along the Åkrafjorden, where is passes the Langfossen waterfall. This was far less than the  minimum requirement for European routes, and well below the minimum requirement to allow two trucks to pass. During the 2010s, a new series of upgrades has been planned to further improve the road in the Seljord-Hjartdal area as well as in Vindafjord.

Places of interest 
The highway runs near several places of interest:
 Heddal Stave Church
 Silvermine in Kongsberg
 Ski museum in Morgedal
 Old Hotel Haukeliseter
 Røldal Stave Church

Road conditions 
When driving along the road, one may see many of the following words on signs or road condition web sites:
 Haukelifjell = The main mountain pass on E 134, just south of the Hardangervidda mountain plateau
 Midlertidig stengt = Temporarily closed
 Kolonnekjøring = Driving in line after a snow plough truck only.
 Nattestengt = Closed by night
 Vegarbeid = Road work
 Kjøreforhold = Driving conditions
 Snø / snødekke = Snowy road
 Is / isdekke = Icy road
 Glatt = Slippery
 Bart = Bare road
 Vått = Wet road
 Fare for elg = Watch out for moose

References

External links 
 UN Economic Commission for Europe: Overall Map of E-road Network (2007)

199134
E134
E134
E134
E134
E134